Stieve is a surname. Notable people with the surname include:

Felix Stieve (1845–1898), German historian
Hermann Stieve (1886–1952), German physician, anatomist, and histologist
Terry Stieve (born 1954), American football player

See also
Steve